The Brotherhood is the twelfth album by German heavy metal band Running Wild.

Songs
"The Ghost" is about Thomas Edward Lawrence, who was a British liaison officer during the Arab Revolt of 1916 to 1918.

Track listing 
All songs by Rolf Kasparek

Personnel 
 Rolf Kasparek – vocals, guitars
 Peter Pichl – bass guitar
 Angelo Sasso – drums

Additional Musician
 Ralf Nowy – backing vocals on "Pirate Song" and "Unation"
 Oni Logan - Vocals on "Doctor Horror"

Production
 Gerhard Woelfe – Engineering (vocals), Mixing (vocals)
 Rainer Holst – Mastering
 Katharina Nowy – Producer (additional), Engineering, Mixing
 Ralf Nowy – Engineering, Mixing
 Ralf Steiner – Photography
 Gabi Steiner – Photography
 Rolf Kasparek – Producer, Engineering, Mixing

Charts

References

2002 albums
Running Wild (band) albums
GUN Records albums